Adnan Sarwar is a Pakistani actor, director, musician, screenwriter, producer, lyricist, doctor and racing driver. He made his film debut in the biopic Shah, in which he also played the leading role.

Career

Music
From 2002 onwards Adnan started his music career as a session guitar player for various Pakistani musicians such as The Trip, Mekaal Hasan Band and Ali Zafar, before forming the duo Club Caramel with singer Kiran Chaudhry in 2006. He has also composed the soundtrack of his debut film Shah.

Film and TV
Adnan made his film debut in the 2015 Pakistani sports biopic Shah, based on the life of Olympian boxer Hussain Shah. Adnan also wrote the screenplay and directed the film as well as composed the original musical score. Adnan trained for the role of the homeless boxer by undergoing a six-month long boxing training regime and lost 10 kilos of body weight. Despite being produced on a shoestring budget by a team of five people, Shah was hailed as "not only an achievement for Adnan Sarwar but for the whole Pakistani film industry" and Sarwar was praised by critics for his portrayal of the Lyari born Pakistani boxing legend.

In April 2017, it was announced that Adnan was working on his second feature film Motorcycle Girl based on the real-life story of Zenith Irfan, who is thought to be the first Pakistani woman to make a solo motorcycle journey across the country at the age of 20. The film released in 2018 to good critical appreciation with Adnan writing, co-producing and directing it. He also wrote the lyrics for one of the movie's two songs, Pahiya.

Adnan marked his TV debut as an actor with Sarmad Khoosat's 2018 drama Aakhri Station.

In January 2019 he announced to make three films by 2020.

Other
Sarwar has trained as a Doctor of Medicine and is a graduate of Baqai Medical University, Karachi, and has previously worked as a doctor in Australia. He is also trained as a high-performance race car driver and has represented Pakistan in lower categories of formula car racing series in various international auto racing competitions, he became the first ever local Pakistani to get selected to race for the A1 GP Team Pakistan in the A1 Grand Prix motorsports Worldcup series. He also founded a company Racing Pakistan, through which his aim was too create awareness of motorsports in Pakistan and to promote and educate young Pakistani talented drivers in international motor racing categories.

Filmography

Films

Television

Web series

Accolades

References

External links
 
 
 

Living people
Pakistani male film actors
Pakistani screenwriters
Pakistani lyricists
Pakistani racing drivers
Musicians from Lahore
Film directors from Lahore
Male actors from Lahore
Punjabi people
1979 births